Ugolnaya railway station is a Russian railway station and railway junction in a valley in the north of the Muravyov-Amursky Peninsula.

Trains
 Moscow — Vladivostok
 Khabarovsk — Vladivostok
 Novosibirsk — Vladivostok
 Novokuznetsk — Vladivostok
 Sovetskaya Gavan — Vladivostok
 Knevichi — Vladivostok (Aeroexpress)

References

Railway stations in Primorsky Krai